Michelle Williams is an American actress who has appeared in film, television, and on stage. Her first screen appearance was at age thirteen in a 1993 episode of the television series Baywatch, and she made her film debut as the love interest of a teenage boy in Lassie (1994). She subsequently had guest roles in the television sitcoms Step by Step and Home Improvement, and played the younger version of Natasha Henstridge's character in the science fiction film Species (1995). Greater success came to Williams when she began starring as the sexually troubled teenager Jen Lindley in the teen drama series Dawson's Creek (1998–2003). In 1999, she made her stage debut with the Tracy Letts-written play Killer Joe.

In the 2000s, Williams eschewed parts in big-budget films in favor of roles with darker themes in independent productions such as Me Without You (2001) and The Station Agent (2003). Despite positive reviews, these films were not widely seen. This changed in 2005 when Williams played the neglected wife of Heath Ledger's character in Brokeback Mountain, a drama about star-crossed gay lovers, which became a critical and commercial success; Williams gained a nomination for the Academy Award for Best Supporting Actress. Her career did not progress much in the next few years, but Kelly Reichardt's Wendy and Lucy (2008), in which she starred as a drifter searching for her missing dog, was critically acclaimed.

Martin Scorsese's thriller Shutter Island (2010), starring Leonardo DiCaprio, in which Williams had a supporting part, became her most widely seen film to that point. She went on to receive two consecutive Oscar nominations for Best Actress for starring as an unhappily married woman in Blue Valentine (2010) and Marilyn Monroe in My Week with Marilyn (2011); she also won a Golden Globe Award for the latter. Williams next played Glinda in the commercially successful fantasy feature Oz the Great and Powerful (2013). On Broadway, she played Sally Bowles in a revival of the musical Cabaret in 2014, and a sexual abuse survivor in a revival of the play Blackbird in 2016. For the latter, she gained a Tony Award for Best Actress nomination. Also in 2016, Williams took on the role of a grieving mother in Manchester by the Sea, earning another Academy Award nomination. The 2017 musical The Greatest Showman and the 2018 superhero film Venom emerged as two of her most commercially successful releases. She returned to television in 2019 to portray Gwen Verdon opposite Sam Rockwell's Bob Fosse in the FX biographical miniseries Fosse/Verdon, winning a Primetime Emmy Award for Best Actress. Williams received her fifth Oscar nomination for starring in Steven Spielberg's semi-autobiographical drama The Fabelmans (2022).

Film

Television

Stage

Music video

Discography

See also
List of awards and nominations received by Michelle Williams

Notes

References

External links
 

Actress filmographies
American filmographies